Tarekeniwal was a Kushite King of Meroe of whom little is known. He likely ruled the Meroitic empire during the 2nd century AD. Tarekeniwal is only known from his pyramid in Meroe (Beg. N 19). His name appears on the pylon of the cult chapel in front of the pyramid, which was in modern times restored. The chapel and its decoration is still well preserved.

References

Literature
Inge Hofmann, Beiträge zur meroitischen Chronologie, St. Augustin bei Bonn 1978, p. 140, 
László Török, in: Fontes Historiae Nubiorum, Vol. III, Bergen 1998, p. 935–936, 
2nd-century monarchs of Kush